Lactarius quieticolor is a member of the large milk-cap genus Lactarius in the order Russulales. It was first described scientifically by French mycologist Henri Romagnesi in 1958.

See also
List of Lactarius species

References

External links

quieticolor
Fungi described in 1958
Fungi of Europe